Mae Fah Luang - Chiang Rai International Airport  is in the city of Chiang Rai in northern Thailand. The airport is about 8 km from the city center. Since 1998 it has been managed by the Airports of Thailand Public Company Limited (AOT). In 2013 the airport handled over 1,000,000 passengers and 7,000 passenger flights. The airport had international flight facilities and served few international routes to Kunming, Haikou, Hangzhou, Changsha, Xishuangbanna, Shenzhen, and Chengdu, all of which have been suspended due to the COVID-19 pandemic.

In 2014, Airports of Thailand said that they would expand Chiang Rai airport. The plans include building an additional taxiway and more shops, and possibly extending the runway. This should be completed in 2030.

Chiang Rai International Airport was named "Mae Fah Luang", after Princess Srinagarindra, mother of the previous monarch, Bhumibol Adulyadej, reigning under the dynastic name of Rama IX.

Statistics

Airlines and destinations

Accidents and incidents 

 30 July 2022: Nok Air Flight 108, a Boeing 737-800 (registered HS-DBR) from Bangkok Don Muang to Chiang Rai with 164 passengers and 6 crew, landed on Chiang Rai's runway 03 at 21:04L (14:04Z) but veered left off the runway and came to a stop all wheels off the paved runway. There were no injuries reported.

See also
Old Chiang Rai Airport (no longer operational)

References

External links

Mae Fah Luang-Chiang Rai International Airport, Official site

Airports in Thailand
Buildings and structures in Chiang Rai province
Airports established in 1992